Michael Anthony Busch (born July 7, 1968) is a former professional baseball player and manager. He played in Major League Baseball as a third baseman for the Los Angeles Dodgers, and also in the KBO League for the Hanwha Eagles.

Busch is an alumnus of Iowa State University where he played both baseball and American football. As a senior in 1989 he was a consensus All-American in football. He was drafted by the Los Angeles Dodgers in the 4th round of the 1990 MLB amateur draft. He made his Major League Baseball debut with the Los Angeles Dodgers on August 30, 1995, becoming the first replacement player to be promoted to a regular MLB roster after the 1994 Major League Baseball strike. Because of his status as a replacement player, Busch was never allowed membership in the MLBPA. He appeared in his final game on August 10, 1996.

Beginning in the 2005 season, Busch was named the head coach of the Calgary Vipers, an independent minor league baseball team in the Northern League. The team has since moved to the Golden Baseball League. On December 1, 2008, the Schaumburg Flyers of the Northern League announced Mike Busch as their new manager for the 2009 season. He remained the Flyers' manager until the team folded before the 2011 season.

References

External links

Mike Busch To Return As Manager Of The Calgary Vipers In 2006
Career statistics and player information from KBO League

1968 births
Living people
Major League Baseball third basemen
Los Angeles Dodgers players
Hanwha Eagles players
Great Falls Dodgers players
Bakersfield Dodgers players
San Antonio Missions players
Albuquerque Dukes players
Buffalo Bisons (minor league) players
Fargo-Moorhead RedHawks players
Sioux Falls Canaries players
American expatriate baseball players in South Korea
KBO League infielders
Northern League (baseball, 1993–2010) managers
Iowa State Cyclones baseball players
Iowa State Cyclones football players
American football tight ends
Major League Baseball replacement players
Baseball players from Iowa
Sportspeople from Davenport, Iowa
All-American college football players
American expatriate baseball people in Canada